Radeon Pro is AMD's brand of professional oriented GPUs. It replaced AMD's FirePro brand in 2016. Compared to the Radeon brand for mainstream consumer/gamer products, the Radeon Pro brand is intended for use in workstations and the running of computer-aided design (CAD), computer-generated imagery (CGI), digital content creation (DCC), high-performance computing/GPGPU applications, and the creation and running of virtual reality programs and games.

The Radeon Pro product line directly competes with Nvidia, i.e. their Quadro (since discontinued) line of professional workstation cards.

Products

Radeon PRO series

Radeon Pro Duo (2016) 
The first card to be released under the Radeon Pro name was the dual GPU Radeon Pro Duo in April 2016. The card features 2 liquid cooled R9 Nano cores & was marketed strongly for both the running and creation of virtual reality content with the slogan "For Gamers Who Create and Creators Who Game". The aesthetics and marketing of the Pro Duo follow that of the rest of the Fury products in the 300 series.

Radeon Pro Duo (2017) 
In April 2017 AMD announced a new version of the Radeon Pro Duo for release the following month. The newer version of the Pro Duo utilizes dual GPUs from the Polaris architecture, using the same GPUs as in the WX7100. While this results a smaller number of compute units and lower theoretical performance, it allows for the inclusion of 32GB GDDR5 SDRAM and a lower board power.

Radeon Pro SSG (Fiji) 
Using AMD Radeon's GCN 3 architecture, the Radeon Pro SSG was unveiled in July 2016. SSG stands for Solid State Graphics, and the card will couple AMD's Fiji core with solid-state storage to increase the frame buffer for rendering. This expansion of quick access storage will, therefore, relieve the issue of latency that occurs when a GPU has to retrieve information from a mass storage device via the CPU when a card's limited VRAM is maxed out in heavy workloads. Users will be able to add up to 1TB of PCIe M.2 NAND flash memory to improve render and scrubbing times. AMD demonstrated a 5.3 fold increase in performance on 8K video scrubbing. This SSD storage space can be made available to the operating system or controlled entirely by the GPU. The Fiji-based Radeon Pro SSG card was available as a beta program.

Radeon Pro SSG (Vega) 
In July 2017, AMD released the Vega-based Radeon Pro SSG. The card utilizes 16GB of second generation ECC high bandwidth memory (HBM2), an upgrade from the Fiji-based card's 4GB of first generation HBM memory. The Vega card also increased the built in solid-state storage to 2TB.

Radeon Vega Frontier Edition 
AMD announced in May 2017 the Radeon Vega Frontier Edition, for release in June of that year. While not branded as a Pro product, the card is marketed within the Radeon Pro series. The Radeon Vega Frontier Edition uses the new "Next-Gen Compute Unit" and 16GB of HBM2 memory for an expected 13.1 TFLOPs of single precision and 26.2 TFLOPs of half precision performance. Ultimately, two Frontier Edition products were released with either air or liquid cooling. The liquid cooling part supported a higher TDP, and was able to reach and sustain higher clock speeds, but otherwise the two products have similar hardware specifications.

Radeon Pro V series

Radeon Pro WX series 
Radeon Pro WX series are graphics cards designed specifically for professional applications used in engineering, design, content creation, and science. The first Radeon Pro cards with the WX prefix to be announced were the WX 7100, the WX 5100 and the WX 4100 in July 2016. These Polaris based cards are once again aimed at the traditional professional market and are set to replace the FirePro Wx100 series and FirePro Wx300 series. These cards, along with the Pro SSG, will use the new, non-toxic and energy efficient YInMn Blue, discovered by Mas Subramanian. This unique aesthetic for the Radeon Pro line will distinguish the professional products from the consumer Radeon series.

The smallest card, the half-height WX 4100, is marketed for use in small form factor workstations. Designed for real-time content engines and CAD and CAM manufacturing, the WX 5100 fits in between the WX 4100 and the WX 7100 in terms of performance, with the latter once again marketed with emphasis on the application of VR and other media creation, while claiming to be "The Most Affordable Workstation Solution".

In June 2017, AMD announced the addition of the lower power WX 2100 and WX 3100 cards to the Radeon Pro WX series. Both cards are based on the Polaris GPU and are rated at 1.25 TFLOPS. The WX 2100 has 2 GB of GDDR5 SDRAM, while the WX 3100 has 4 GB of GDDR5 memory.

In September 2017, AMD launched the WX 9100 based on the Vega architecture. The card features 16 GB of ECC HBM2 memory and is rated at 12.29 TFLOPS. As the new flagship of the WX line, it greatly exceeds the performance of the older WX 7100 which is rated at 5.73 TFLOPS. The WX 9100 has ISV (Independent Software Vendor) certified drivers for professional applications including Siemens NX, PTC Creo, Dassault Systèmes CATIA and 3DExperience Platform, Dassault Systèmes SOLIDWORKS, and Autodesk® Revit®. The WX 9100 is particularly well-suited for mission critical workloads and complex scientific modeling because the ECC memory helps correct "single or double bit error as a result of naturally occurring background radiation."

Radeon Pro 400 series 
Mobile Radeon Pro parts were first revealed with the release of the 2016 update to the Apple 15" MacBook Pro. These appear to be Polaris 11 derived parts with 10-16 4th generation GCN compute units, providing between 1 and 1.86 TFLOPS of performance.

Radeon Pro 500 series 
Released in conjunction with the 2017 Apple iMac refresh, the Radeon Pro 500 series serve as GPUs for the 4K and 5K Retina display iMacs. The 500 series ranges supports 2 to 8 GB of graphics RAM with performance from 1.3 to 5.5 TFLOPS.

Radeon Pro Vega series 
The Radeon Pro Vega product line of GPUs were first announced in 2017 as a part of Apple's iMac Pro. The two models, Radeon Pro Vega 56 and 64, support 8 and 16 GB of HBM2 memory, respectively. On October 30, 2018, Apple added graphics upgrade options for their 15-inch MacBook Pro lineup consisting Radeon Pro Vega 16 and 20. Derived from Vega 12 GPU that was only used on Apple laptops, both GPU features a 4GB HBM2 memory stack and performance up to 3.3 TFLOPS.

The second-generation, 7 nm Radeon Pro Vega II was announced in 2019 as part of Apple's third-generation Mac Pro desktop computer. The Pro Vega II supports 32 GB of HBM2 memory, while the Pro Vega II Duo combines two Vega GPUs and supports 64 GB of HBM2 memory. The Mac Pro supports up to two Pro Vega II or Pro Vega II Duo graphics cards, allowing up to four Vega GPUs and 128 GB of HBM2 memory to be used in a system.

Radeon Pro VII series 
The Radeon Pro VII was announced in May 2020, as a professional variant of the Radeon VII.

Radeon Pro 5000/5000M series 
Released in conjunction with the 2019 Apple 16 inch MacBook Pro. Two models were announced, the 5300M and the 5500M.  Both feature GDDR6 memory interfaces, with 192 GB/s bandwidth.  The 5500M supports up to 8 GB of GDDR6 and 4.0 TFLOPS. In June 2020, a new 5600M GPU model with 8 GB of HBM2 memory was quietly released.

Radeon Pro W5000/W5000M series 
The Radeon Pro W5700, which is based on RDNA Architecture for desktop workstations, was officially released on November 19, 2019. The smaller model Radeon Pro W5500 was released in February 2020.

Radeon Pro W5000X series

Radeon Pro W6000/W6000M series 
The first RDNA2 based W6000 series cards were officially announced on June 8, 2021 and launched in Q3 2021, with the AMD Radeon Pro W6800, W6600 and W6600M for mobile. On January 19, 2022, the W6400 was also released.

Radeon Pro W6000X series

Software 

Most professional compute is done with the help of the Radeon Open Compute and the GPUOpen platforms.

Project Loom 
At an AMD event in 2016 Project Loom was announced as a collaboration between AMD and Radiant Images. The real-time GPU accelerated photo and video stitching program will complement AMD's virtual reality development platform. While traditional photo stitching is not that much of a complex task, Project Loom aims to improve render times when tasked with the heavy workload of stitching together multiple high resolution angles to form a 360 degree VR experience, either to headsets or mobile devices. Using AMD's Direct GMA protocol, the software allows Radeon Pro graphics cards to work directly with video capture hardware to stitch together a 30 fps, 360 degree 4k resolution video from 24, 1080p cameras at 60 fps.

The software is to be competitive with Nvidia's VRWorks 360 Video SDK, and is reportedly set to be made open-source through GPUOpen.

ProRender 
The successor to FireRender, Radeon ProRender works with high-end graphics programs as an OpenCL photorealistic offline 3D renderer and raytracing engine. ProRender aims to compete with programs such as NVIDIA's Iray and other expensive, proprietary solutions. However, AMD is making ProRender free and available for all graphics hardware. ProRender was released by AMD in June 2016 with support for Blender, 3D Studio Max, SolidWorks, and Maya.

Driver 
API OpenGL 4.5 is supported and 4.6 is in development.
API Vulkan 1.0 is supported for all with GCN Architecture. Vulkan 1.1 (GCN 2nd Gen. and higher) will be supported with actual drivers in 2018.

As with other GPU architectures, the floating-point performance is dependent on the precision and the GCN generation:
 In 4th Gen GCN, FP64 is 1/16 of FP32. Newer gaming cards have better ratios, which should be reflected on newer derivative "Pro" versions:
 The gaming card Radeon R9 295X2 has it bumped up to 1/8 FP32.
 The gaming card Radeon VII has it bumped up to 1/4 FP32.
 The Radeon Pro Vega 20 has the ratio bumped up to 1/2 FP32.
 In 5th Gen GCN, FP16 is double of FP32. In 1st Gen to 4th it was equal to FP32.

For those requiring higher FP64 performance, a form of FP64 distinct from the IEEE double-precision can be emulated with the much faster FP32 operations. The cost is around a ~1/3 performance compared to FP32, much better than what the native support could provide.

Chipset table

Workstation

Radeon PRO series

Radeon Pro WX x100 series

Radeon Pro WX x200 series

Radeon Pro Vega (for Apple Mac Pro)

Radeon Pro VII

Radeon Pro 5000 series (for Apple iMac)

Radeon Pro W5000 series

Radeon Pro W5000X series (for Apple Mac Pro)

Radeon Pro W6000 series

Radeon Pro W6000X series (for Apple Mac Pro)

Mobile Workstation

Radeon Pro WX x100 Mobile series 
 Half Precision Power (FP16) is equal single precision power (FP32) in 4th GCN Generation (in 5th Gen: Half Precision (FP16) = 2x SP (FP32))

Radeon Pro 400 series (for Apple MacBook Pro)

Radeon Pro 500 series (for Apple iMac & MacBook Pro)

Radeon Pro WX x200 Mobile series

Radeon Pro Vega series (for Apple iMac & MacBook Pro)

Radeon Pro 5000M series (for Apple MacBook Pro)

Radeon Pro W5000M series

Radeon Pro W6000M series

Data Center GPUs

Radeon Pro V series

See also 
 AMD FirePro – AMD's predecessor to Radeon Pro
 AMD Instinct – AMD's professional HPC/GPGPU server solution, successor to FirePro S (server line)
 Nvidia Quadro – Nvidia's competing workstation graphics solution
 Nvidia Tesla – Nvidia's competing GPGPU solution
 List of AMD graphics processing units

References

External links 
 AMD Radeon Pro Graphics
 AMD Radeon Pro Graphics (archived July 29, 2016)
 AMD Radeon ProRender
 AMD Software: PRO Edition

AMD graphics cards